Wallace Hall is a 2-18 school in Thornhill, Dumfries and Galloway, in the south-west of Scotland, currently with a roll of over 600 pupils (secondary) and 150 pupils (primary).

History

The original Wallace Hall was founded by John Wallace, a merchant in Glasgow and a native of Closeburn, who left £1.600 for the purpose of erecting the Academy in 1723.  The John Wallace Trust continues to support young people in the Thornhill area by offering bursaries to help with the cost of higher education.

Until the early nineteen seventies there were two secondary schools in the local area: the six-year Wallace Hall Academy at Closeburn and the four-year Morton Academy at Thornhill. In 1972 the two schools amalgamated and the new school at Thornhill became known as Wallace Hall Academy.  Prior to this amalgamation an extensive building programme was started in 1970 and completed in 1978 in order to accommodate the pupils of both schools.  The school continued to flourish on this site until, as part of Dumfries and Galloway Council's £100 million project to build nine new schools within the region, a new Wallace Hall Academy was built over the road beside the original school playing fields. The construction of the building started on 16 January 2008 and the new school opened in January 2010.

The school closed temporarily in March 2020 following government guidelines to prevent the spread of COVID-19. During the winter of 2020, the school partially reopened, with some pupils permitted to attend on the basis that they require access to specialist equipment to complete national qualifications.

From March 2021, following government restrictions easing, the school fully reopened for all pupils, implementing mitigating measures (such as mandatory mask wearing and social distancing) to guard against the spread of COVID-19. In Spring 2022, all mitigations were dropped and the school returned to normal operations. 

In May 2022, the school held its first diet of SQA examinations since 2019, having returned to normal operations after the COVID-19 pandemic.

Notable former pupils
Jonny Blair, film director
Dr Aglionby Ross Carson, educator
Andrew Coltart, European Tour golfer
Prof John Hunter joint founder of the Royal Society of Edinburgh and Principal of two colleges at St Andrews University
Emily Smith, Scottish folk music singer
Nicky Spence, opera singer
Andrew Wallace Williamson, KCVO and Chaplain-in-Ordinary to the King in Scotland; also Dean of the Order of the Thistle and the Chapel Royal in Scotland, 1910–25; Moderator of the Church of Scotland 1913–1914

References

External links
Wallace Hall Academy website
Wallace Hall Academy's page on Scottish Schools Online

People educated at Wallace Hall Academy
Secondary schools in Dumfries and Galloway
Thornhill, Dumfries and Galloway